Aemona pealii is a species of butterfly of the family Nymphalidae. It is found in Assam in India.

References

Amathusiini
Butterflies described in 1880